Bruce Read Evans (1929 – 1993) was an Anglican bishop and author in the 20th century.

He was educated at King Edward School, Johannesburg and the  University of the Witwatersrand and ordained in 1957. He held curacies at Holy Trinity, Redhill, Surrey and St Paul's, Portman Square. He was curate-in charge at St Luke's, Diep River, Cape. He held incumbencies at Christ Church, Kenilworth, Cape Town and St John's, Wynberg, Cape Town, before his ordination to the episcopate as the second Bishop of Port Elizabeth. He died in post.

Published works
Among other books, he wrote I Will Heal their Land, 1974; The Earth is the Lord’s, 1975; Facing the New Challenges, 1978; and The Church and the Alternative Society, 1979

Sources

1929 births
1993 deaths
Alumni of King Edward VII School (Johannesburg)
University of the Witwatersrand alumni
Anglican bishops of Port Elizabeth
20th-century Anglican Church of Southern Africa bishops